Cobaki may refer to:
Cobaki, New South Wales, town in Tweed Shire, NSW, Australia
Cobaki, Afghanistan, location mentioned in connection with America's Response Monument INew York City